Cleveland Watkiss,  (born 21 October 1959), is a British vocalist, actor, and composer.

Biography
Cleveland Watkiss was born in Hackney, East London, to Jamaican parents, and was one of nine children. He is the older brother of pianist Trevor Watkis (and the different spelling of their surname is deliberate).

At age 16, he won twice in a local singing talent competition, hosted by "FatMan" of FatMan Sound System (North East London Based Roots, Reggae & Dub Sound System).

Watkiss studied at the London School of Singing with opera coach Arnold Rose and subsequently at the Guildhall School of Music and Drama with Lionel Grigson. Watkiss was one of the co-founders of the vastly influential Jazz Warriors big band, and his vocals can be heard on their debut album, Out of Many People (1987), which won a video award in Japan.
Watkiss was then entered for the Wire/Guardian Jazz Awards and was voted best vocalist for three consecutive years, and was the opening act of choice for Cassandra Wilson and Abbey Lincoln. The Guardian music journalist John Fordham described Watkiss as "arriving on the scene with a bang".

Watkiss has performed with a diverse range of artists from around the world, including: Courtney Pine, Stevie Wonder, Shakatak, James Taylor Quartet, Working Week, The Who, Coldcut, Lisa Stansfield, Maxi Priest, Jason Rebello, Goldie, Björk, Talvin Singh, Om Unit, Bob Dylan, Jackie Mittoo, Keith Richards, Art Blakey, Sly & Robbie, Abdullah Ibrahim, DJ Patife, Carlinhos Brown, Wynton Marsalis and the Jazz at Lincoln Center Orchestra, Robbie Williams, Joe Cocker, Bobby McFerrin, Branford Marsalis, George Martin, Bocato Big Band, Janet Kay, Soul II Soul, Kassa Mady, Halogenix, Kenny Wheeler Big Band, Sugar Minott, London Community Gospel Choir, Malik & the O.G's and many more. He has also worked with symphonic orchestras such as the Royal Philharmonic Orchestra, London Chamber Orchestra among others.

Watkiss is a keen music educator, working as a voice instructor for SingUp, with workshops in venues/schools, colleges and universities around the UK.

More recently, Watkiss was cast in the starring role in Julian Joseph and Mike Phillips's ground-breaking jazz operas Bridgetower and Shadowball. Joseph has said of Watkiss: "He has that incredible charisma, that wonderful voice. He has the jazz sound and the power of an opera singer." 

Watkiss has performed in many of the major concert halls, festivals and clubs around the world with "VocalSuite", a solo voice performance, and with his new Quartet "CWQ", accompanied by Shaney Forbes (drums), Mark Hodgson (bass) and Marco Piccioni (guitars).

Reviewing a solo performance at The Vortex, Ivan Hewett wrote in The Telegraph: "Cleveland Watkiss is such a restlessly curious musician, it's hard to know where to place him. He has sung with the Who and gospel choirs, he has appeared in straight-ahead jazz contexts and in drum and bass, he has worked with video artists, DJs, Indian percussionists, Japanese musicians. All these encounters have left their traces on him, as was clear from his solo gig at the Vortex. Just as important was the virtuoso way a reference to one musical style would morph into another. This worked so well because it was done in a spirit of play....
But it wasn't all fun and games. Watkiss earlier on spun some ecstatic variations on a Chopin prelude that had us all spellbound."

Awards and honors
 Best Vocalist, London Jazz Awards, 2010
 Best Vocalist, Wire/Guardian Jazz Awards
 Jazz Vocalist of the Year, Parliamentary Jazz Awards, 2017
 MBE, 2018 New Year Honours
 Ivor Novello Award for Innovation 2021

Discography
 Green Chimneys (Urban, 1989)
 Blessing in Disguise (Polydor, 1991)
 23 (Dorado, 1996)
 Victory's Happy Song (Touchdown Soundz, 2001)
 The Great Jamaican Songbook, Vol. 1 (Cdubya Music 2022)

References

External links
 Official site

1959 births
Living people
English drum and bass musicians
English jazz singers
English people of Jamaican descent
English reggae musicians
Jazz Warriors members
Members of the Order of the British Empire
People from Hackney Central
Alumni of the Guildhall School of Music and Drama